Stefan Hefin Gravell Jenkins (born 17 April 1974) is a former Welsh cricketer.  Jenkins was a right-handed batsman who bowled both right-arm medium pace and right-arm off break.  He was born in Carmarthen, Carmarthenshire.

Jenkins made his debut for Wales Minor Counties in the 1996 Minor Counties Championship against Berkshire.  He played Minor counties cricket for Wales Minor Counties from 1996 to 1999, which included 7 Minor Counties Championship matches and 4 MCCA Knockout Trophy matches.  In 1998, he made his List A debut against Nottinghamshire, in the NatWest Trophy.  He played 2 further List A matches for the team, against Lincolnshire and the Derbyshire Cricket Board in 1999 NatWest Trophy.  In his 3 List A matches, he scored 73 runs at a batting average of 24.33, with a high score of 44.

References

External links
Stefan Jenkins at ESPNcricinfo
Stefan Jenkins at CricketArchive

1974 births
Living people
Cricketers from Carmarthen
Welsh cricketers
Wales National County cricketers